Nickelodeon Universe is the name of two indoor amusement parks located at Mall of America in Bloomington, Minnesota and American Dream  in East Rutherford, New Jersey, with a third location under construction at the Mall of China in Chongqing, China. The parks consist of attractions and rides based on Nickelodeon’s popular franchises. The amusement parks are owned and operated by the Triple Five Group with licensing rights from Paramount Global, which owns Nickelodeon.

Mall of America

History

Camp Snoopy

The park was originally known as Knott's Camp Snoopy, and later, simply Camp Snoopy, and was themed around the Charles M. Schulz Peanuts comic strip characters. Camp Snoopy themed areas are still located at Cedar Fair Amusement Company's parks. Camp Snoopy was never aggressively themed; the park had a very outdoors and woodsy feel with more subtle references to the Peanuts franchise. Much of the original theming in the Camp Snoopy fountain and all around the park was already toned down by the time the rights to the Peanuts characters were lost. Theming that was removed from the park prematurely and was never replaced includes various kites near the ceiling, Charlie Brown and Lucy playing baseball above the Sports Grill restaurant (although their baseball remained suspended in the air afterwards), theming in Snoopy fountain, the retheming of Snoopy Boutique, Snoopy Bouncer, the Snoopy Shop and much smaller theming. On April 7, 1998, New Horizon Kids Quest, Inc. opened a Kids Quest hourly child care facility in Knott's Camp Snoopy. It incorporated  and served children ages six weeks to twelve years until its removal in 2007. It is now the "Dutchman’s Deck Adventure Course" ropes course, slides and zip line.

In 2005, there were plans to revitalize the Camp Snoopy image and a new logo was introduced in October, called the "roller coaster logo" to replace the "canoe logo". However, this did not last long, as there were even bigger and unexpected changes coming within the next few months.

The Park at Mall of America
On January 9, 2006, Mall of America management announced that talks between MOA and Cedar Fair (which owns the national rights to amusement-park branding of the Peanuts license) had broken down, primarily over the mall's rights to effectively market its park within and outside the United States, and effective January 19, the park's Peanuts branding would end, the park being temporarily renamed The Park at MOA while new branding was being applied. All traces of the Peanuts branding was removed, some very sloppily, although the gift shops were allowed to continue selling Peanuts merchandise without the Camp Snoopy label. The inflatable Snoopy character was removed and it took several months before it was finally replaced by a generic tree house inflatable. Many other landmarks in the park were either replaced by generic landmarks or not replaced at all.

Nickelodeon Universe

On November 2, 2005, Viacom filed a trademark for Nickelodeon Universe.
The park's new licensing deal and name, "Nickelodeon Universe", was announced on July 25, 2007. Construction began on August 27, 2007, work was completed in sections so 80 percent to 90 percent of the park remained accessible at all times. Nickelodeon Universe was completed on March 15, 2008. New rides include SpongeBob SquarePants Rock Bottom Plunge, a Gerstlauer Euro-Fighter style coaster themed after the Nickelodeon show SpongeBob SquarePants, the Splat-O-Sphere, a tower drop-ride in the center of the park, the Avatar Airbender, a surf-rider attraction located in the center of the park as well and Brain Surge which is on the side of the park. The shooting gallery beneath the Ripsaw/Orange Streak roller coaster was gutted and was replaced by Rugrats Reptarmobiles. The Mystery Mine Ride was completely demolished to make way for SpongeBob SquarePants Rock Bottom Plunge. This site also included an Old Time Photography studio and restrooms. Old Time Photography relocated into the mall (but not within the park) and restrooms did not return in this section of the park. Levy Restaurants partnered with Nickelodeon Universe to include a themed restaurant at the park. The restaurant was called EATS and was located in the former Park at MOA food court. When the partnership ended, the EATS area closed and was replaced with a butterfly display. In 2014, a Hard Rock Cafe opened on the site where EATS once stood.

On March 12, 2008, the Star Tribune reported that the price of ride points, daily wristbands and, in particular, annual passes, would take a significant price hike once the park transitioned to Nickelodeon Universe. The price for an annual pass, which had remained $99 per year since the park opened in 1992, would increase to $250, and daily wristbands would be raised from $24.95 to $29.95. They eventually rose to $32.99 in 2014. In 2017, prices rose to where they currently stand, at $35.99 for a daily wristband. In April 2015, the price for the annual pass dropped to $139. In November 2021, Nickelodeon Universe announced the new annual pass program which has 3 different annual passes: Level 1 is Explorer which costs $175 but only valid on the weekdays, which is Monday through Thursday, Level 2 is Adventurer costs $250 but only works on any day of the week & Level 3 is Thrill Seeker costs $350 and it has all access all the time. Some denounced the price increases as being unjustifiably high when compared to other parks, such as local park Valleyfair at $79.95–$99.95. Others defended the pricing as necessary to accommodate the millions of dollars of investment needed to rebrand the park as Nickelodeon Universe.

On March 17, 2020, Nickelodeon Universe closed along with the rest of Mall of America in response to the COVID-19 pandemic. While the mall re-opened in June, Nickelodeon Universe didn't re-open until August. As a result of restrictions put in place by the Minnesota state government, Nickelodeon Universe was only permitted to re-open to a capacity of 250. Thus, the previous ticketing model—where entry to the park was free and patrons could either pay for rides individually, or unlimited–ride tickets that valid for the entire day—was temporarily suspended. Patrons then had only the option of a ticket that was valid for two hours from when it was first scanned at a ride; persons not riding were required to have a paid ticket to enter the park, albeit at a reduced cost. Capacity restrictions eventually loosened into the spring, resulting in the return of all-day unlimited-ride wristbands and point passes. The park reopened to full capacity on May 28, 2021.

Rides and attractions

Roller coasters

Thrill rides

Family rides

Kiddie attractions

Others

Former rides

Dining
 Caribou Coffee
 Grub
 Sweet Treats 
 Hard Rock Cafe
 Various carts featuring popcorn, mini donuts, cotton candy, Dippin Dots ice cream, Pepsi beverages and ICEE beverages

Former dining
 Tall Timbers
 Stampede Steakhouse
 Mrs. Knott's Restaurant
 Mrs. Knott's Picnic Basket
 The Silver Stein-Festhaus
 Festhaus Buffet
 Hormel Cook Out
 McGarvey Camp Bakery
 EATS
 Cool Treats 
 Schwan's Ice Cream Cafe (replaced by Sweet Treats)
 Slurp and Snack (replaced by Grub)

Retail
 Nickelodeon Shop
 Toys
 Gear
 LEGO Store
 M&M's World

Former retail
 4U (Replaced by Peeps & Company, which eventually closed and became the mall's second IT'SUGAR location called "Candy Universe". This IT'SUGAR location is now closed.)
NU Stuff (replaced by Gear)
 Candy Universe (operated by IT'SUGAR)
 American Girl Store

Accidents

 On August 1, 1998, a 12-year-old boy, David Craig of Cable, Wisconsin, was killed after he fell off the Log Chute. When the boat neared the top of the chute, he began to panic and reached outside of the log to grab a railing. The ride stopped, but the log had already begun its descent down the major drop. Losing his grip, Craig fell off the chute, falling onto the landscaping rocks. He then died as a result of his injuries. O.D. Hopkins Associates, Inc., the manufacturer of the ride, inspected it and found it was in proper working order. It was Camp Snoopy's first fatal accident.
 On Saturday, August 15, 1998, an 8-year-old girl died of a heart attack a week before her 9th birthday, after she rode the Screaming Yellow Eagle (later known as Danny Phantom Ghost Zone), a rotating platform ride from Chance Rides. Her parents said she died from a heart attack because she had a history of heart problems for five years before her death. The ride was operating properly.

American Dream

History
In September 2016, the Triple Five Group announced that a second Nickelodeon Universe amusement park would fill the 8-acre indoor amusement park space at American Dream, which will feature two world record-holding roller coasters. TMNT Shellraiser, a Gerstlauer Euro-Fighter, would hold the record for the steepest roller coaster drop at 121.5 degrees, and is based on a model seen in Japan.  The second coaster, a spinning coaster called the Shredder, consists of four-passenger cars that spin on a vertical axis as it progresses down the coaster's track, and is the world's tallest and longest free spinning coaster, at 1,600 feet.

On March 13, 2020, Triple Five announced that the mall would be closed due to the COVID-19 pandemic, and the opening of retail shops and DreamWorks Water Park would be delayed.

On April 6, 2020, American Dream changed from a mix of 55% entertainment-related tenants and 45% retailers to roughly 70% entertainment and 30% retail. As of April 10, 2020, no retailers had backed out of American Dream. American Dream said it will add eight more rides to the Nickelodeon Universe theme park, building on its early success.

On September 3, 2020, Triple Five announced that on October 1, American Dream would reopen its amusement park, water park, ice rink, and mini-golf arcade, each of which would limit patrons to 25% of capacity.

Rides and attractions

Roller coasters

Other rides

Additional locations

Chongqing, China
A third Nickelodeon Universe theme park is currently under construction for the Mall of China in Chongqing, China. Concept artwork that was released during the theme park's announcement on July 26, 2018 showcases rides that are at the American Dream location, as well as a drop-tower ride themed to Jimmy Neutron. Construction was briefly paused in March 2020 due to the COVID-19 pandemic. While the theme park was originally slated for a December 2020 opening, its construction status and a new opening timeframe are unknown.

New Orleans, Louisiana
On August 18, 2009, Nickelodeon and Southern Star Amusement announced that a Nickelodeon Universe would be built in New Orleans, Louisiana to replace the former Six Flags New Orleans that was destroyed by Hurricane Katrina in 2005 and would open around the end of 2010. It was set to be the first outdoor Nickelodeon Universe theme park, but on November 9, 2009, Nickelodeon announced that it had ended the licensing agreement with Southern Star Amusements.

2020 temporary closures
The two Nickelodeon Universe theme parks in Minnesota and New Jersey were temporarily closed in March 2020 due to the COVID-19 pandemic. Nickelodeon Universe reopened at Mall of America on August 10, 2020, while its park at American Dream reopened on October 1, 2020.

See also

 Galaxyland at West Edmonton Mall

References

External links
 Official website
 
 Nickelodeon Universe Store website
 Nickelodeon Universe information and photos

 
Amusement parks in Minnesota
Indoor amusement parks
Knott's Berry Farm
Buildings and structures in Bloomington, Minnesota
u
1992 establishments in Minnesota
2008 establishments in Minnesota
Amusement parks opened in 2008
Tourist attractions in Hennepin County, Minnesota
Amusement parks in New Jersey
Buildings and structures in Bergen County, New Jersey
2019 establishments in New Jersey
Amusement parks opened in 2019
Tourist attractions in Bergen County, New Jersey
East Rutherford, New Jersey